The Curtiss V-1570 Conqueror was a 12-cylinder vee liquid-cooled aircraft engine. Representing a more powerful version of the Curtiss D-12, the engine entered production in 1926 and flew in numerous aircraft.

Design and development
Designed in 1924 as a military successor to the Curtiss D-12, initially named the Conqueror, it was later given the military designation of V-1570 based on its displacement of 1,570 cubic inches (26 L). The engine featured open-ended cylinder liners (advanced technology for the period) and pressurized liquid cooling. Developments including the use of a supercharger gradually increased power output until reliability problems due to overheating and coolant leaks became apparent. Military funding for further development of the Conqueror was cut in 1932, efforts by Curtiss to market the engine for civil airliners failed and the line was dropped from production.

Variants

V-1570-1
V-1570-5
V-1570-7
GV-1570-7 geared -7
V-1570-9
V-1570-11
V-1570-13
V-1570-15
SV-1570-15
V-1570-17
V-1570-23
V-1570-25
V-1570-27
V-1570-29
V-1570-33
V-1570-53
V-1570-55
V-1570-57
V-1570-59
V-1570-61
V-1570-79
GIV-1570-FM
V-1570-C
V-1570-F
GIV-1570C

Applications

Atlantic XB-8
Bellanca TES (1930 version)
Berliner-Joyce P-16
Boeing XP-9
Boeing Y1B-9
Consolidated A-11
Consolidated P-30
Consolidated Y1P-25
Curtiss A-8
Curtiss B-2 Condor
Curtiss CO Condor
Curtiss P-1 Hawk
Curtiss P-6 Hawk
Curtiss XO-30 (not built)
Curtiss XP-10
Dornier Do X
Douglas O-31
Douglas O-43
Douglas Y1B-7
Huff-Daland XB-1
Lockheed YP-24
Thomas-Morse YO-23
Tupolev TB-3

Other applications
Mormon Meteor III (custom Bonneville salt flat race car)

Specifications (V-1570 direct drive)

See also

References

Notes

Bibliography

 Gunston, Bill. World Encyclopedia of Aero Engines. Cambridge, England. Patrick Stephens Limited, 1989. 
 Grey, C.G. Jane's all the World's Aircraft 1931 London, England. Sampson Low, Marston & Company Limited 

V-1750
1920s aircraft piston engines